An election to Waterford City Council took place on 10 June 1999 as part of that year's Irish local elections. 15 councillors were elected from three local electoral areas  for a five-year term of office on the system of proportional representation by means of the single transferable vote (PR-STV).

Results by party

Results by Electoral Area

Waterford No.1

Waterford No.2

Waterford No.3

External links

1999 Irish local elections
1999